Choral Evensong is the BBC's longest-running outside broadcast programme. The programme is a broadcast of the Anglican service of Choral Evensong (sung evening prayer) live from cathedrals, university college chapels and churches throughout the United Kingdom.

Broadcasting

It is transmitted every Wednesday at 16:00 on BBC Radio 3, with a repeat on Sunday afternoons at 15:00. The most recent edition is available on BBC Sounds for one month following the original broadcast. There is also an archive available.

On occasion, Choral Vespers from Catholic cathedrals (such as Westminster Cathedral), Orthodox Vespers, or a recorded service from choral foundations abroad are broadcast, at which time it is referred to as Choral Vespers.

History

The first edition was relayed by the British Broadcasting Company from Westminster Abbey on 7 October 1926. The programme continued on the BBC Home Service, later BBC Radio 4, until 8 April 1970, when it moved to BBC Radio 3.

In 1970 the programme was reduced to just one broadcast per month, but the BBC received 2,500 letters of complaint, and weekly transmissions were resumed on 1 July of that same year.

In 2007 the live broadcast was switched to Sundays, which again caused protests. The live transmission returned to Wednesdays in September 2008, with a recorded repeat on Sunday afternoons at approximately the same time. Choral Evensong forms part of Radio 3's religious programming remit, although non-religious listeners have also campaigned for its retention.

Its 80th and 90th anniversary programmes were celebrated live from Westminster Abbey, with services on 11 October 2006 and 28 September 2016 respectively.

References

External links
 

BBC Home Service programmes
BBC Radio 4 programmes
BBC Radio 3 programmes
1926 radio programme debuts
BBC music
Christian liturgical music
Church music
Anglican church music
Anglican liturgy
Anglicanism
Church of England
Book of Common Prayer
Evening